Digitivalva longipennella is a moth of the family Acrolepiidae. It is found in Taiwan.

References

Acrolepiidae
Moths described in 1972